Ignar Fjuk (born 12 March 1953, Tartu) is an Estonian architect, politician and radio journalist, most notable for being one of the voters for the Estonian restoration of Independence.

He graduated from Hugo Treffner Gymnasium in 1971, and from the Estonian Academy of Arts in 1976 as an architect. For years, Klassikaraadio has been broadcasting his Räägivad talk show. In 1987, the Culture Council of the Estonian SSR's Artistic Associations was created on his initiative. Fjuk was a member of the Estonian Centre Party. He is currently in the Estonian Reform Party. He was a member of the Constitutional Assembly, as well as a member of the Riigikogu. Fjuk, along with Estonian, speaks English, Russian and Polish.

Awards
2001: 3rd Class of the Estonian Order of the National Coat of Arms (received 23 February 2001)

Further reading
Piret Lindpere. "Fjuk, Ignar". // Eesti kunsti ja arhitektuuri biograafiline leksikon. Eesti Entsüklopeediakirjastus. Tallinn 1996. Pages 76–77

References

1953 births
Living people
People from Tartu
Politicians from Tartu
Estonian Centre Party politicians
Members of the Riigikogu, 1992–1995
Members of the Riigikogu, 1995–1999
Members of the Riigikogu, 1999–2003
Estonian Academy of Arts alumni
Estonian journalists
Estonian architects
Hugo Treffner Gymnasium alumni
Recipients of the Order of the National Coat of Arms, 3rd Class
Voters of the Estonian restoration of Independence
21st-century Estonian politicians